The Wulai Scenic Train, also known as Wulai Trolley, is a 1.6 km railway line in Wulai District, New Taipei, Taiwan.

History
The rail cart was originally designed by the Japanese government in 1928 to transport timber, logging tools, tea and passengers. After a highway was completed in 1951, most of the railway sections were dismantled except the 1.6 km section. However, with the declining timber and logging industries, the vehicle was transformed to transport tourists. In 1964, the railway was upgraded to two tracks to increase its capacity. In 2015, the railway was closed due to damage caused by Typhoon Soudelor in which 120 meters of section was completely destroyed. It was reopened on 26 August 2017 after almost two years of reconstruction work.

Design
Each cart can accommodate up to 10 passengers. The total length of the track is 1.6 km.

List of stations

Transportation
The railway is accessible by bus from Xindian Station of Taipei Metro.

See also
 Rail transport in Taiwan
 List of railway stations in Taiwan

References

1928 establishments in Taiwan
Railway lines in Taiwan
Tourist attractions in New Taipei
Wulai District